Morten Falch Petersen (born 5 August 1973) is a retired Danish football defender.

References

1973 births
Living people
Danish men's footballers
F.C. Copenhagen players
K.A.A. Gent players
Hvidovre IF players
Danish Superliga players
Belgian Pro League players
Association football defenders
Danish expatriate men's footballers
Expatriate footballers in Belgium
Danish expatriate sportspeople in Belgium
Denmark under-21 international footballers
Footballers from Copenhagen